Flatey may refer to either of two islands in Iceland:
Flatey, Breiðafjörður
Flatey, Skjálfandi

See also
 Flateyjarbók, one of the most important medieval Icelandic manuscripts